The 2010 Biathlon Junior World Championships was held in Torsby, Sweden from January 27 to February 2 2010. There was to be a total of 16 competitions: sprint, pursuit, individual, mass start, and relay races for men and women.

Medal winners

Youth Women

Junior Women

Youth Men

Junior Men

Medal table

References

External links
Official IBU website 

Biathlon Junior World Championships
Junior World Championships|2010
2010 in Swedish sport
International sports competitions hosted by Sweden
January 2010 sports events in Europe
February 2010 sports events in Europe
Junior World Championships|2010
Sport in Värmland County
2010 in youth sport